Lieutenant-General Sir William Henry Pringle GCB (21 August 1772 – 23 December 1840) was a British Army officer who served as a Member of Parliament (MP) for two constituencies in Cornwall.

He was born the eldest son of Maj-Gen. Henry Pringle, of Dublin and educated privately and at Trinity College Dublin.

He joined the British Army as a cornet and progressed to the rank of Colonel of the 64th Foot in 1816. Further promotion to Lieutenant-General followed before he was transferred as Colonel for life in 1837 to the 45th Regiment of Foot. He was made KCB in 1815 and GCB in 1834.

He was MP for St Germans from 1812 to 1818, and then for Liskeard from 1818 to 1832.

He died in 1840. He had married Harriet Hester Eliot on 20 May 1806 (the daughter and heiress of Hon. Edward James Eliot) with whom he had a son and 4 daughters.

References

 

|-

 

1770s births
1840 deaths
British Army generals
British Army personnel of the Napoleonic Wars
Knights Grand Cross of the Order of the Bath
Members of the Parliament of the United Kingdom for Liskeard
Members of the Parliament of the United Kingdom for St Germans
UK MPs 1812–1818
UK MPs 1818–1820
UK MPs 1820–1826
UK MPs 1826–1830
UK MPs 1830–1831
UK MPs 1831–1832